Yana Alborova (born 24 January 1994) is a Russian-Uzbekistani  foil fencer, now representing Uzbekistan internationally. In 2015, she won the silver medal in the women's foil event at the 2015 European Games held in Baku, Azerbaijan. She also won the gold medal in the women's team foil event.

In 2017, she won the silver medal in both the women's individual foil and women's team foil events at the 2017 Summer Universiade held in Taipei, Taiwan.

Since 2019 Alborova has been representing Uzbekistan. She competed in the women's foil event at the 2019 World Fencing Championships held in Budapest, Hungary without winning a medal. She was eliminated in her first match by Kata Kondricz of Hungary.

References

External links 
 

1994 births
Living people
Place of birth missing (living people)
Russian female foil fencers
Fencers at the 2015 European Games
European Games medalists in fencing
European Games gold medalists for Russia
European Games silver medalists for Russia
Universiade medalists in fencing
Universiade silver medalists for Russia
Medalists at the 2017 Summer Universiade
Uzbekistani female foil fencers